Ichthyosis is a family of genetic skin disorders characterized by dry, thickened, scaly skin. The more than 20 types of ichthyosis range in severity of symptoms, outward appearance, underlying genetic cause and mode of inheritance (e.g., dominant, recessive, autosomal or X-linked). Ichthyosis comes from the Greek ἰχθύς ichthys, literally "fish", since dry, scaly skin is the defining feature of all forms of ichthyosis.

The severity of symptoms can vary enormously, from the mildest, most common, types such as ichthyosis vulgaris, which may be mistaken for normal dry skin, up to life-threatening conditions such as harlequin-type ichthyosis.  Ichthyosis vulgaris accounts for more than 95% of cases.

Types
Many types of ichthyoses exist, and an exact diagnosis may be difficult. Types of ichthyoses are classified by their appearance, if they are syndromic or not, and by mode of inheritance. For example, non-syndromic ichthyoses that are inherited recessively come under the umbrella term autosomal recessive congenital ichthyosis (ARCI).

Ichthyosis caused by mutations in the same gene can vary considerably in severity and symptoms. Some ichthyoses do not appear to fit exactly into any one type while mutations in different genes can produce ichthyoses with similar symptoms. Of note, X-linked ichthyosis is associated with Kallmann syndrome (close to the KAL1 gene). The most common or well-known types are:

Non-syndromic ichthyosis

Syndromic Ichthyosis

Non-genetic ichthyosis 
Ichthyosis acquisita

Diagnosis
A physician often can diagnose ichthyosis by looking at the skin. A family history is also useful in determining the mode of inheritance. In some cases, a skin biopsy is done to help to confirm the diagnosis while in others genetic testing may be helpful in making a diagnosis. Diabetes has not been definitively linked to acquired ichthyosis or ichthyosis vulgaris; however, there are case reports associating new onset ichthyosis with diabetes.

Ichthyosis has been found to be more common in Native American, Asian, Mongolian groups. There is no way to prevent ichthyosis.

Ichthyosis is a genetically and phenotypically heterogeneous disease that can be isolated and restricted to the skin manifestations or associated with extracutaneous symptoms. One of which is limb reduction defect known as CHILD syndrome; a rare inborn error of metabolism of cholesterol biosynthesis that is usually restricted to one side of the body. One case with symptoms matching CHILD syndrome has been described as having a likely-different cause.

Treatments
Treatments for ichthyosis often take the form of topical application of creams and emollient oils, in an attempt to hydrate the skin. Creams containing a high percentage of urea or lactic acid have been shown to work exceptionally well in some cases. Application of propylene glycol is another treatment method. Retinoids are used for some conditions.

Exposure to sunlight may improve or worsen the condition. In some cases, excess dead skin sloughs off much better from wet tanned skin after bathing or a swim, although the dry skin might be preferable to the damaging effects of sun exposure.

There can be ocular manifestations of ichthyosis, such as corneal and ocular surface diseases. Vascularizing keratitis, which is more commonly found in congenital keratitis-ichythosis-deafness (KID), may worsen with isotretinoin therapy.

Other animals
Ichthyosis or ichthyosis-like disorders exist for several types of animals, including cattle, chickens, llamas, mice, and dogs. Ichthyosis of varying severity is well documented in some popular breeds of domestic dogs. The most common breeds to have ichthyosis are Golden retrievers, American bulldogs, Jack Russell terriers, and Cairn terriers.

See also
 European Network for Ichthyosis – International patients network run by national European patients associations
 Skin disease
 Ichthyosis en confetti
 List of cutaneous conditions
 List of cutaneous neoplasms associated with systemic syndromes

References

External links 

 
 Ichthyosis Overview - US National Institute of Arthritis and Musculoskeletal and Skin Diseases

Genodermatoses
Rare diseases